WABG-TV (channel 6) is a television station licensed to Greenwood, Mississippi, United States, serving the Delta area as an affiliate of ABC and Fox. It is owned by Imagicomm Communications alongside two low-power stations: Grenada-licensed NBC affiliate WNBD-LD (channel 33) and Cleveland-licensed CBS affiliate WXVT-LD (channel 17). The three stations share studios on Washington Avenue in Greenville; WABG-TV's transmitter is located northeast of Inverness, Mississippi.

History
WABG-TV's first broadcast was on October 20, 1959, on VHF channel 6. Originally it was a CBS affiliate, with a secondary affiliation with ABC owing to WABG radio (960 AM)'s affiliation with ABC Radio. In 1966, the station built a  tower near Inverness and increased its effective radiated power to 100,000 watts. Following its completion in October 1966, WABG dropped CBS to become a full-time ABC affiliate in November 1966. Until then, the only areas of the state to receive a sole ABC affiliate were the northwest (from Memphis' WHBQ-TV) and the Gulf Coast (from WVUE in New Orleans). Until future sister station WXVT signed on in 1980, WJTV in Jackson served as the default CBS affiliate for the southern counties in the Delta area, while WREG-TV in Memphis served the northern half of the market, Mississippi cities like Kosciusko received WABG-TV on their analog television set as their default ABC station from 1970 to 2009, as WAPT in Jackson did not have a strong signal on analog television in the Kosciusko area. On March 12, 1986, the studios of WABG were damaged by a fire triggered by an electrical short circuit after the station signed off the air for the night. With no injuries being reported, the station was forced to relocate its transmission signal.

The station was a significant beneficiary of a quirk in the Federal Communications Commission (FCC)'s plan for allocating stations. In the early days of broadcast television, there were twelve VHF channels available and 69 UHF channels (later reduced to 55 in 1983). The VHF bands were more desirable because they carried longer distances. Since only twelve VHF channels were available, there were limitations on how closely the stations could be spaced.

After the FCC's Sixth Report and Order ended the license freeze and opened the UHF band in 1952, it devised a plan for allocating VHF licenses. Under this plan, almost all of the country would be able to receive two commercial VHF channels plus one noncommercial channel. Most of the rest of the country ("") would be able to receive a third VHF channel. Other areas would be designated as "UHF islands" since they were too close to larger cities for VHF service. The "2" networks became CBS and NBC, "+1" represented non-commercial educational stations, and "" became ABC (which was the weakest network usually winding up with the UHF allocation where no VHF was available).

However, what would become of the Greenville market is sandwiched between Memphis (channels 3, 5, 10, and 13) to the north; Jackson, Mississippi (channels 3 and 12) to the south; Jackson, Tennessee (channels 7 and 11) to the northeast; and Columbus–Tupelo, Mississippi (channels 2, 4, and 9) to the east. This created a "doughnut" in northwestern Mississippi where there could only be one VHF license. Broadcaster Cy N. Bahakel of Charlotte, North Carolina, owner of WABG radio, was fortunate to gain that license, and consequently became the only television station to serve the Delta region until WMAO-TV signed on in 1972; the market would not gain another commercial station until WXVT signed on in 1980. Although there was no station operating on channel 8 in the immediate area, KNOE-TV in Monroe, Louisiana had been operating in that community on channel 8 since 1953, and it was well within the FCC-mandated interference limit for co-channel separation to allow a channel 8 allocation to the Delta region.

On September 5, 2007, WABG announced it was being sold from Bahakel Communications to local businessman Charles Harker and his company, Commonwealth Broadcasting. The sale was finalized on October 29. On July 13, 2010, Commonwealth announced plans to launch a new low-powered station, WNBD-LD, as the area's first locally based NBC affiliate; prior to WNBD's launch, NBC was seen in the market through Memphis' WMC-TV or Jackson's WLBT on area cable systems, as well as over-the-air on the edges of the market. Commonwealth also has a license for WFXW-LD channel 17, which is licensed to Cleveland and shares WABG's tower in Inverness. The unused callsign WFXW-LD would become WXVT-LD on June 26, 2017.

On May 4, 2012, Saga Communications, owner of WXVT, announced it was selling WXVT to H3 Communications, a company owned by the adult children of Charles Harker. On January 28, 2013, the FCC granted the sale of WXVT, and it was completed two days later.  Commonwealth then took over WXVT's operations, effectively bringing all of the Delta's Big Three network stations under the control of one company.

In 2015, WABG and WXVT appeared in a TruTV reality series Breaking Greenville. It premiered January 29, 2015 and ended on March 26, 2015.

Commonwealth Broadcasting Group agreed to sell WABG-TV, WNBD-LD, and WFXW-LD to Cala Broadcast Partners for $11.7 million on October 30, 2015. Cala is jointly owned by Brian Brady (who owns several other television stations, mostly under the Northwest Broadcasting name) and Jason Wolff (who owns radio and television stations through Frontier Radio Management). Concurrently with this acquisition, Cala agreed to purchase WXVT from H3 Communications; a month later, it assigned its right to purchase that station to John Wagner. The sale was completed on August 1, 2016.

On January 1, 2017, Cable One (now Sparklight) removed channels owned by Northwest Broadcasting (WABG-TV, WXVT, WABG-DT2 and WNBD-LD) after the two companies failed to reach an agreement. On February 1, 2017, the channels were restored to Cable One's lineup under a new carriage deal.

In February 2019, Reuters reported that Apollo Global Management had agreed to acquire the entirety of Brian Brady's television portfolio, which it intends to merge with Cox Media Group (which Apollo is acquiring at the same time) and stations spun off from Nexstar Media Group's purchase of Tribune Broadcasting, once the purchases are approved by the FCC. In March 2019 filings with the FCC, Apollo confirmed that its newly-formed broadcasting group, Terrier Media, would acquire Northwest Broadcasting, with Brian Brady holding an unspecified minority interest in Terrier. In June 2019, it was announced that Terrier Media would instead operate as Cox Media Group, as Apollo had reached a deal to also acquire Cox's radio and advertising businesses. The transaction was completed on December 17.

On March 29, 2022, Cox Media Group announced it would sell WABG-TV, WNBD-LD, WXVT-LD and 15 other stations to Imagicomm Communications, an affiliate of the parent company of the INSP cable channel, for $488 million; the sale was completed on August 1.

WABG-DT2
WABG-DT2 is the Fox-affiliated second digital subchannel of WABG-TV, broadcasting in 720p high definition on channel 6.2.

History

On September 13, 2006, WABG launched a Fox affiliate, "Delta Fox 10," on a new second digital subchannel. Previously, the national Foxnet service provided Fox programming to cable subscribers in the Delta area, which was one of the last markets to be offered the service. The cable-only service originally planned to close down on September 1, 2006 but was delayed until September 12 to allow WABG time to set up the new affiliate.

When WABG-DT2 started operations, it was not a 24-hour station due to a lack of syndicated programming rights. "Delta Fox" aired programming from 5:00 p.m. to 10:35 p.m. weekdays, 4:00 p.m. to 10:30 p.m. on Saturdays, and 5:00 p.m. to 10:35 p.m. on Sundays outside football and NASCAR seasons. "Delta Fox" aired all Fox Sports programming on weekends regardless of starting time. Because of this limited schedule, it would not carry the network's Saturday morning children's block, 4Kids TV. On October 26, 2009, DeltaFOX 10 started broadcasting 20 hours of programming Monday through Friday along with extended hours on the weekends, eventually having a full 24/7 schedule.

Programming
Like many ABC affiliates in rural areas in the South and all ABC affiliates in Mississippi, WABG did not carry NYPD Blue when it first premiered, but on January 3, 1995, it began airing the series. In 1994, WABG was one of two ABC affiliates that did not air the Roseanne episode "Don't Ask, Don't Tell" that featured a same-sex kiss between Roseanne and guest star Mariel Hemingway.

Newscasts

WABG-TV presently broadcasts 14½ hours of locally produced newscasts each week (with 2½ hours each weekday and one hour each on Saturdays and Sundays). In addition, channel 6 also simulcasts the news on its DT2 subchannel, WNBD-LD and WXVT-LD. In 2019, WABG-TV began producing newscasts for sister station KLAX-TV in Alexandria, Louisiana.

Technical information

Subchannels
The station's digital signal is multiplexed:

Analog-to-digital conversion
WABG-TV shut down its analog signal, over VHF channel 6, on February 17, 2009 at 11:59 p.m., as part of the federally mandated transition from analog to digital television. The station's digital signal remained on its pre-transition UHF channel 32, using PSIP to display WABG's virtual channel as 6 on digital television receivers.

See also
Channel 6 virtual TV stations in the United States
Channel 10 branded TV stations in the United States
Channel 32 digital TV stations in the United States

References

External links
Official website

ABG-TV
ABC network affiliates
Fox network affiliates
Television channels and stations established in 1959
1959 establishments in Mississippi
Imagicomm Communications